The gare de Blois is a railway station serving the town Blois, Loir-et-Cher department, central France. It is situated on the Paris–Bordeaux railway, between Orléans and Tours.

Services

The station is served by regional trains (TER Centre-Val de Loire) to Tours, Nantes and Orléans.

References

Railway stations in Loir-et-Cher
TER Centre-Val de Loire
Railway stations in France opened in 1847
Gare de Blois
Blois
19th-century architecture in France